Bauch is the German word for belly. It is used as a surname, notable people with the name include:

Bruno Bauch (1877–1942), German Neo-Kantian philosopher
Christa Bauch (b. 1947), Professional female bodybuilder from Germany
Emil Bauch (1823-after 1874), German painter, lithographer and teacher who made his reputation in Brazil
Herbert Bauch (b. 1957), Boxer who represented East Germany at the 1980 Summer Olympics
Jan Bauch (1898–1995), Czech artist especially noted as a painter and sculptor
Kurt Bauch (1897–1975), German art historian